Motus may refer to:

 Motus, LLC, a workforce management company
 Motus O dance theatre, a dance company
 Motusbank, a Canadian online-only bank
 Motus Motorcycles, maker of the Motus MST vehicle
 The Path of Motus, a video game

See also
 Motu (disambiguation)
 Mottus